Battle of Kupres may refer to:

 Battle of Kupres (1942), a World War II battle of the Independent State of Croatia and the Yugoslav Partisans
 Battle of Kupres (1992), battle of the Bosnian War involving the Yugoslav People's Army and the Croatian Defence Council (HVO)
 Battle of Kupres (1994), battle of the Bosnian War involving the Army of the Republic of Bosnia and Herzegovina, the Army of Republika Srpska and the HVO

See also
 Kupres (disambiguation)